Nelson Rubens Chelle Naddeo (May 18, 1931 – December 17, 2001) was a basketball player from Uruguay, who won the bronze medal with the men's national team at the 1956 Summer Olympics in Melbourne, Australia. Four years later he once again competed in the Olympics for his native country.

References

External links

1931 births
2001 deaths
Basketball players at the 1956 Summer Olympics
Basketball players at the 1960 Summer Olympics
Olympic basketball players of Uruguay
Olympic bronze medalists for Uruguay
Uruguayan men's basketball players
1959 FIBA World Championship players
Uruguayan people of French descent
Sportspeople from Paysandú
Olympic medalists in basketball
Medalists at the 1956 Summer Olympics